Blind Squirrel Games is an American video game developer based in Santa Ana, California. It was founded in 2010 by Brad Hendricks and is a subsidiary of Blind Squirrel Entertainment. Notable products include BioShock: The Collection and Mass Effect Legendary Edition.

History 
Brad Hendricks founded Blind Squirrel Games in 2010. While working on the back end for the website GameSpy, he felt there had been too few work-for-hire studios working with larger companies on AAA video games and established the studio in this capacity. The company originally consisted of four people, including Hendricks as chief executive officer. In March 2016, Blind Squirrel Games was reorganized as a subsidiary of Blind Squirrel Entertainment, which was incorporated in Delaware.

By the time Blind Squirrel Games worked with 2K Games on BioShock: The Collection, the studio had grown to 87 people, covering development, design, production, and quality assurance. Hendricks considered this a turning point that would allow the studio to grow past contributing to other developers' projects and begin fully developing games. Due to the cancellation of an unannounced project, Blind Squirrel Games laid off thirteen people (nine artists and four support staff) in May 2018. Three further projects, each with twenty to thirty engaged employees, were canceled in October 2018. The studio failed to find new projects for most of these and downsized from 110 to 48 people within six months. Blind Squirrel Games received new jobs in early 2019 and began hiring again.

In March 2019, the company raised  from undisclosed investors for the development and self-publishing of its first original game, Drifters. According to Hendricks, the company had been in discussion with "literally every publisher" but failed to find a partner willing to publish an original game from a company that usually worked on external properties. During the COVID-19 pandemic in 2020, Blind Squirrel Games operated "almost as normal" with its 110 employees. To improve morale, it used a proprietary platform for employees to join virtual clubs about their interests, a project headed by the senior community manager Kitty Mach. The studio aimed to establish a secondary office in Austin, Texas, with thirty to forty people in late 2020, next to its Santa Ana, California, headquarters.

Games

References

External links 
 

2010 establishments in California
American companies established in 2010
Companies based in Santa Ana, California
Video game companies based in California
Video game companies established in 2010
Video game development companies